Reds is a 1981 American epic historical drama film, co-written, produced, and directed by Warren Beatty, about the life and career of John Reed, the journalist and writer who chronicled the October Revolution in Russia in his 1919 book Ten Days That Shook the World. Beatty stars in the lead role alongside Diane Keaton as Louise Bryant and Jack Nicholson as Eugene O'Neill.

The supporting cast includes Edward Herrmann, Jerzy Kosiński, Paul Sorvino, Maureen Stapleton, Gene Hackman, Ramon Bieri, Nicolas Coster, and M. Emmet Walsh. The film also features, as "witnesses", interviews with the 98-year-old radical educator and peace activist Scott Nearing, author Dorothy Frooks, reporter and author George Seldes, civil liberties advocate Roger Baldwin, and the American writer Henry Miller, among others.

Beatty was awarded the Academy Award for Best Director and the film was nominated for Best Picture, but lost to Chariots of Fire. Beatty, Keaton, Nicholson, and Stapleton were nominated for Best Actor, Best Actress, Best Supporting Actor and Best Supporting Actress, respectively. Stapleton was the only one of the four to win. Beatty became the third person to be nominated for Academy Awards in the categories Best Actor, Director, and, with co-writer Trevor Griffiths, Original Screenplay—losing again to Chariots of Fire—for a film nominated for Best Picture.

In June 2008, the American Film Institute revealed "AFI's 10 Top 10"—the best ten films in ten "classic" American film genres—after polling over 1,500 people from the film community. Reds came in ninth in the epic genre.

Plot 
In 1915, married journalist and suffragist Louise Bryant encounters the radical journalist John Reed for the first time at a lecture in Portland, Oregon, and is intrigued with his idealism. After meeting him for an interview on international politics that lasts an entire night, she realizes that writing has been her only escape from her frustrated existence. Inspired to leave her husband, Bryant joins Reed in Greenwich Village, New York City, and becomes acquainted with the local community of activists and artists, including anarchist and author Emma Goldman and the playwright Eugene O'Neill.

Later, they move to Provincetown, Massachusetts, to concentrate on their writing, becoming involved in the local theater scene. Through her writing, Bryant becomes a feminist and radical in her own right. Reed becomes involved in labor strikes with the "Reds" of the Industrial Workers of the World. Obsessed with changing the world, he grows restless and heads for St. Louis to cover the 1916 Democratic National Convention.

During Reed's absence, Bryant falls into a complicated affair with O'Neill. Upon his return, Reed discovers the affair and realizes he still loves Bryant. The two marry secretly and make a home together in Croton-on-Hudson, New York, but still have conflicting desires. When Reed admits his own infidelities, Bryant takes a ship to Europe to work as a war correspondent. After a flare-up of a kidney disorder results in him having one of them removed, Reed is warned to avoid excessive travel or stress, but he decides to take the same path as Louise and goes to Europe. Reunited as professionals, the two find their passion rekindled as they travel to Russia and are swept up in the fall of the Czarist regime and the events of the 1917 Revolution.

After returning to the United States, Reed writes Ten Days that Shook the World, while Louise is called to testify in front of the Overman Committee. In order to implement the Communist ideals he saw in Russia, Reed becomes active in the Socialist Party of America's new Left Wing Section. The Socialist Party soon undergoes a major political shift, with Reed and the Left Wing elected to 12 of its National Executive Committee's 15 seats, but the sitting members of the Committee prevent a takeover of the party by invalidating the election and expelling the entire Left Wing. Differing ideology among the expelled members causes them to splinter into two rival organizations, with Reed forming the Communist Labor Party of America. Anxious to establish his group as the United States' true Communist Party, Reed plans to return to Russia to secure official recognition from the Soviet Comintern. Having grown tired of the political infighting, Bryant threatens to end their relationship if he goes, but he does so anyway, promising to be home by Christmas.

As it was now illegal to travel to Russia, Reed enters the country by traveling to Finland and sneaking across the border. Once there, though, he grows disillusioned with the authoritarian policies the Bolsheviks have imposed upon Communist Russia. Reed attempts to leave and return to Bryant, but is imprisoned in Finland after being caught trying to cross the border. After learning of his arrest, Louise seeks the U.S. government's help in securing his release, but it refuses, as in his absence he has been indicted on charges of sedition. With no other recourse, Louise illegally travels to Finland herself, but by the time she arrives Reed has been returned to Russia as part of a prisoner exchange between the two countries.

Now living in Petrograd, Reed is employed as a propagandist with the Comintern, and shares an apartment with Emma Goldman, who had been deported from the U.S. Unaware that Louise has traveled to Finland, he repeatedly tries to make contact with her by sending telegrams to New York and becomes increasingly frustrated by the lack of response. Louise makes her way to Petrograd, where she is found by Emma, who tells her Reed was sent to deliver a speech in Baku. On his return to Petrograd, the Czarist White Army attacks Reed's train. Reed manages to survive the attack and is reunited with Louise at the train station. Soon thereafter, he is admitted to the hospital, where he dies of typhus, with Louise at his side.

Cast

Production

Development 
Beatty came across the story of John Reed in the mid-1960s. Executive producer and film editor Dede Allen remembers Beatty's mentioning making a film about Reed's life as early as 1966. Originally titled Comrades, the first script was written by Beatty in 1969, but the process stalled. In 1973, Beatty was offered the role of Reed in Sergei Bondarchuk's Soviet film production Red Bells, but declined, and felt further driven to make his own biopic about Reed to compete with the Soviet version.

In 1976, Beatty found a suitable collaborator in Trevor Griffiths, who began work but was delayed by his wife's death in a plane crash. The preliminary draft of the script was finished in 1978. Beatty still had problems with it and he and Griffiths spent four and a half months fixing it. Beatty also collaborated with his friends Robert Towne, Peter Feibleman and Elaine May to continue polishing the script after shooting had begun.

Financing 
Beatty achieved tremendous success with 1978's Heaven Can Wait, which he produced, starred in, co-wrote and co-directed for Paramount Pictures. The success gave Beatty the clout to seek funding for his long nurtured Reds project, which was difficult to secure because of the controversial Communist subject matter and high price tag. Beatty succeeded in interesting both Warner Bros. and Paramount, before the head of Gulf+Western (Paramount's parent company), Charles Bluhdorn, agreed to finance the project. Bluhdorn soon had second thoughts, and attempted to dissuade Beatty with the promise of underwriting a $25 million alternative to Reds of Beatty's choice, but Beatty remained committed.

Casting 
Beatty originally had no intention of acting in the film or even directing it because he had learned on projects such as Bonnie and Clyde and Heaven Can Wait that producing a film alone is a difficult task. He briefly considered John Lithgow for the part of John Reed because the two were similar in appearance, but eventually Beatty decided to act in the film and direct it himself. Nicholson was cast as Eugene O'Neill over James Taylor and Sam Shepard. Nicholson was older than the young O'Neill he was playing, and having just completed work on Kubrick's The Shining, was in a "most shambolic" and "grotesque" physical state, according to producer Simon Relph. But Nicholson was committed to the role and appeared at the start of filming four months later having lost the weight he had gained and looking much younger.

Beatty also chose to cast non-actors in supporting roles, including George Plimpton, the editor of The Paris Review, who played the character of Horace Whigham. Jerzy Kosiński, a Polish-American novelist, was asked to play the role of Grigory Zinoviev, but he initially refused because he was a fierce anti-Communist and feared that he might be abducted by the KGB if he went to Finland to film.

The Witnesses 
To gain perspective on the lives of Reed and Bryant, Beatty filmed interviews with a group of men and women, referred to only as "The Witnesses", as early as 1971. American Film identified the witnesses in its March 1982 issue.

In a capsule review for The New York Times, film critic Vincent Canby refers to them as "more than two dozen very, very old people, billed only as The Witnesses, whom Mr. Beatty interviewed about the Reeds and their long-gone times." He went on to say, "More than anything else in Reds, these interviews give the film its poignant point of view and separate it from all other romantic adventure films ever made." "The most evocative aspect of the presentation is a documentary enhancement – interviews with a number of venerable 'witnesses,' whose recollections of the period help to set the scene, bridge transitions and preserve a touching human perspective", wrote Gary Arnold of The Washington Post.

 Jacob Bailin, labor organizer
 Roger Nash Baldwin, founder, American Civil Liberties Union
 John Ballato, early socialist
 Harry Carlisle, writer, teacher
 Kenneth Chamberlain, political cartoonist for The Masses
 Andrew Dasburg, painter
 Tess Davis, cousin of Louise Bryant's first husband
 Will Durant, historian
 Blanche Hays Fagen, member of the Provincetown Players
 Hamilton Fish, congressman, Harvard classmate of John Reed
 Dorothy Frooks, recruiting girl, World War I
 Hugo Gellert, artist for The Masses
 Emmanuel Herbert, student in Petrograd, 1917–18
 George Jessel, entertainer
 Oleg Kerensky, son of Alexander Kerensky
 Isaac Don Levine, journalist, translator for Reed
 Arthur Mayer, film historian, Harvard classmate of Reed, also film distributor
 Henry Miller, novelist
 Adele Nathan, member of the Provincetown Players
 Scott Nearing, sociologist, pacifist
 Dora Russell, delegate to Comintern
 Adela Rogers St. Johns, journalist
 George Seldes, U.S. journalist in Moscow
 Art Shields, political activist
 Jessica Smith, political activist
 Arne Swabeck, member, Communist Labor Party
 Bernadine Szold-Fritz, journalist
 Galina von Meck, witness to Russian Revolution
 Heaton Vorse, son of a Provincetown playwright
 Will Weinstone, organizer, U.S. Communist Party
 Rebecca West, writer, novelist
 Lucita Squier, screenwriter and widow of Albert Rhys Williams, who was an American participant in the Russian Revolution, pro-Soviet author, friend and biographer of Lenin

Filming 
When principal photography began in August 1979 the original intention was for a 15- to 16-week shoot, but it ultimately took one year. Filming took place in five different countries and at various points the crew had to wait for snow to fall in Helsinki (and other parts of Finland), which stood in for the Soviet Union, and for rain to stop in Spain. Beatty asked the Soviet government for a permit to film in Moscow but was denied. A cottage in Kent was used to depict exteriors of the Reeds' home in Croton-on-Hudson, which in reality was a small early American saltbox house. The interior sets built at Twickenham Studios and EMI-Elstree Studios were also enlarged to evoke the "flavor" of the real home without reproducing it exactly.

Other English locations included Frensham Ponds in Surrey, which stood in for Provincetown, the Smeaton Room of the Institution of Civil Engineers at One Great George Street for the Liberal Club meeting room in Portland, and the interior of Lancaster House for that of the Winter Palace in St. Petersburg. Another round of filming began in 1980 in New York City, Washington D.C., and Los Angeles, including Paramount Studios.

The Italian cinematographer Vittorio Storaro was banned from shooting the scenes shot in the U.S. after he was unable to gain an H-1B visa and because local trade unions blocked him from doing work on the film. The film encountered similar problems with trade unions in the United Kingdom, and had to hire a separate British crew and pay British actors enrolled in Equity at Screen Actors Guild-rate salaries in order to allow American actors to film scenes in the U.K. These trade disputes caused the film to run heavily over budget, but the studio ultimately recouped its costs after financing the film with a low-interest loan from Barclays Bank as part of a tax-shelter plan.

Actress Maureen Stapleton was due to begin shooting her scenes in London in November 1979, but she refused to take a plane because of a fear of flying. Because it was the wrong season for ocean liner travel, the production had to arrange for Stapleton to travel on a tramp steamer, which broke down in the North Atlantic and had to be towed to Amsterdam. This caused another unwelcome delay. Beatty would also not stop the camera between takes, letting it roll continuously, and insisted on a large number of takes. Paul Sorvino said he did as many as 70 takes for one scene; Stapleton had to do 80 takes of one scene, which caused her to say to Beatty, "Are you out of your fucking mind?"

Beatty and Keaton's romantic relationship also began to deteriorate during filming. Peter Biskind wrote about the making of Reds, "Beatty's relationship with Keaton barely survived the shoot. It is always a dicey proposition when an actress works with a star or director—both, in this case—with whom she has an offscreen relationship. Keaton appeared in more scenes than any other actor save Beatty, and many of them were difficult ones, where she had to assay a wide range of feelings, from romantic passion to anger, and deliver several lengthy, complex, emotional speeches." George Plimpton once observed, "Diane almost got broken. I thought [Beatty] was trying to break her into what Louise Bryant had been like with John Reed." Executive producer Simon Relph adds, "It must have been a strain on their relationship because he was completely obsessive, relentless."

Post-production 
The editing process began in early 1980, with as many as 65 people working on editing down and going over approximately 2.5 million feet of film. Post-production ended in November 1981, more than two years after the start of filming. Paramount stated that the final cost of the film was $32 million, which would be the rough equivalent of around $80 million in 2007.

Music 
The film introduced the song "Goodbye for Now", written by Stephen Sondheim, recorded by Jean-Pierre Rampal and Claude Bolling. The song was later recorded by Barbra Streisand for The Movie Album (2003).

Reception 
Released on December 4, 1981, Reds opened to critical acclaim. Despite its political subject matter and limited promotion by Beatty, the film became the 13th-highest-grossing picture of 1981, grossing $40 million in U.S. box office revenues, a figure that does not include the film's foreign box office revenues or its substantial subsequent earnings in home video, worldwide broadcast and cable television, and subscription television and streaming services. Beatty later remarked that the film "made a little money" in box office returns. During the film's second and third weekends, there were concerns that it would become a massive flop like Heaven's Gate, but it performed more strongly over the next month. The film was screened at the White House for President Ronald Reagan.

John Simon of the National Review wrote, "Never exactly boring, sometimes entertaining, Reds is frequently irritating and finally disappointing". Commentary published a largely negative review by Richard Grenier, who, among other things, saw the film as deliberately obscuring the protagonists' Communist politics and as exaggerating Bryant's talent and accomplishments. Conversely, in a retrospective article for Jacobin, Jim Poe called Reds "one of the greatest and most faithful depictions of revolutionary politics", praising its "light touch and brisk storytelling" for an epic, as well as its cinematography, shifts in mood and performances, in particular those of Keaton and Beatty.

Reds holds an 89% "Fresh" rating on the review aggregate website Rotten Tomatoes based on 47 reviews, with an average rating of 7.90/10. The site's consensus reads, "Brawny in both intellect and scope, Reds is an intimate epic that captures the tumult of revolutionary change and the passion of those navigating through it." On Metacritic, the film has a score of 76 out of 100 based on 15 reviews, indicating "generally favorable reviews".

Awards and nominations 

The film is recognized by the American Film Institute in these lists:
 AFI's 100 Years...100 Passions – #55
 AFI's 10 Top 10 – #9 Epic Film

References 
Notes

Citations

External links 

 
 
 Review of Reds; Vincent Canby, The New York Times (December 4, 1981)
 "Film on a Revolution Was a Revolution Itself"; A.O. Scott, The New York Times (October 4, 2006)

1981 films
1980s biographical drama films
1980s historical drama films
American biographical drama films
American epic films
American historical drama films
American political drama films
Cultural depictions of Leon Trotsky
Cultural depictions of Vladimir Lenin
1980s English-language films
Films scored by Dave Grusin
Films about journalists
Films about communism
Films about anarchism
Films directed by Warren Beatty
Films whose director won the Best Directing Academy Award
Films whose director won the Best Director Golden Globe
Films featuring a Best Supporting Actress Academy Award-winning performance
Films produced by Warren Beatty
Films set in the 1910s
Films set in 1920
Films set in Russia
Films shot in Finland
Films shot in Lincolnshire
Films whose cinematographer won the Best Cinematography Academy Award
1980s German-language films
1980s Russian-language films
Films with screenplays by Warren Beatty
Paramount Pictures films
1981 drama films
Films shot at Twickenham Film Studios
Films shot in London
Films shot in Kent
Films shot in Helsinki
Films set in Portland, Oregon
Films set in Massachusetts
Films set in New York (state)
Films set in New York City
Russian Revolution films
Films set in the Soviet Union
Films set in Moscow
Films set in Saint Petersburg
Films shot at EMI-Elstree Studios
Films shot in Los Angeles
Films shot in Washington, D.C.
Films set in St. Louis
Films shot in New York City
Films shot in Surrey
Films shot in Greater Manchester
1981 multilingual films
American multilingual films
Films scored by Stephen Sondheim
1980s American films